Back on Track may refer to:
Back on Track (Billy Craddock album), 1989
Back on Track (DeBarge Family album), 1991
Back on Track (Humble Pie album), 2002
Back on Track (Lulu album), 2004
Back on Track (film), a 2013 German comedy film